William Fellowes Morgan may refer to:

 William Fellowes Morgan Sr. (1860–1943), American banker, businessman, and politician
 William Fellowes Morgan Jr. (1889–1977), American businessman and public official